Herybert Menzel (10 August 1906 in Obornik in Poland – February 1945 in Tirschtiegel in Posen) was a German poet and writer during the time of National Socialism as well as a member of the Bamberg poet circle.

Life 
Menzel was the son of a postal secretary and grew up in the border town of Tirschtiegel. After the Abitur in Crossen he studied two semesters of law at Breslau and Berlin . He then settled in his hometown as a freelance writer In 1926 he published his first independent publication, the volume of poetry  Mond, Sonne und Stern und Ich. Kleine Lieder.

The tensions between Poles and Germans in the border region of Poznan-West Prussia shaped his artistic work. Menzel inter alia relies on this conflict-laden atmosphere in his home region. in the works Grenzmärkische sagas (1929), Der Grenzmark-Blackpe. Grenzmärkische sagas, stories, ballads and poems (1933) as well as in his first novel Controversial Earth (1930). The latter brought it to several editions with a total of at least 56,000 copies by 1943. With the novel“It is aesthetically, but also ideologically, a simply knitted text that uses an undemanding friend-foe dichotomy. It takes place around 1918/20, towards the end of the First World War and in the following twelve months, in the province of Poland and deals with the conflict between the previous German ruling class and their opponent, the Polish population. The concrete historical reference point is the […] Poznan (or Greater Poland) Uprising. "Already before 1933 Menzel joined the NSDAP (membership number 1.043.489) and the SA (in 1943 he achieved the rank of Sturmbannführer). After the "seizure of power" by the National Socialists, Menzel was best known for his poems, songs, and cantatas. In October 1933 he was one of the 88 writers who gave the "Pledge of the most loyal allegiance" to Adolf Hitler. Poems in his volume of poetry  Im   March step of the SA  (1933) contributed to his reputation as "Homer of the SA" at. His productions found their way into mass media literature as propaganda contributions:

Vorm Bild des Führers
Wenn ich nur zweifle, schau ich auf dein Bild,
Dein Auge sagt mir, was allein uns gilt.
So manche Stunde sprech ich wohl mit dir,
Als wärst du nah und wüßtest nun von mir.
Wo immer einer still wird vor der Tat,
Er kommt zu dir, du bester Kamerad.
In deinem Antlitz steht es ernst und rein,
Was es bedeutet, Deutschlands Sohn zu sein.

Menzel published in the newspaper "Völkischer Beobachter", in the series "Junge Volk" and contributed to the HJ yearbook "The young team". On the occasion of the 6th anniversary of Horst Wessel 's death in 1936 he wrote the cantata "Ewig lives the SA", which was performed on 23 February 1936 in 739 cities of the German Reich. From 1933 to 1935 he was a board member of the Reich Association of German Writers. From 29 March 1936 he belonged to the Reichstag, which was insignificant during the time of National Socialism. In 1938 he became a member of the Bamberg Poets' Circle.

During his (first) military service for the "Third Reich", Menzel suffered such serious injuries in France in June 1940 that he had to be treated in hospitals for almost a year and after his service in a convalescent hospital Company was finally discharged from military service in November 1941. Menzel now fully devoted himself to his work as a freelance writer and now also wrote dramatic and prose texts as well as a chamber play. In his last published volume of poetry, 'Anders kehren wir wieder' (1943), Menzel's disparaging, inhuman attitude towards the Slavic (especially Polish) population is revealed again. This becomes clear, for example, from the following verses, which refer to the Warsaw captured by the Wehrmacht and its inhabitants.[…] Da das Feuer schon Ruß ward, / Der Leichendunst sich verzog, das Überlebende / Schon wieder schachert und lacht und lüstet / Und alles dies leugnet; rot sind die Münde, / Die Gier wuchert im Grauen; dies war reif, / O, überreif zur Verdammnis. […] / […], wir zwingen zum / Gleichschritt wieder uns alle, wir Sieger. / Stiefel, bestaubter, durch Staub weiter! Du triffst / Nichts, was verworfen nicht war.The writer also pursued Propaganda in the sense of the Nazi regime on his lecture tours to Norway (1941) and Bulgaria (1942). Poems by him found their way into the flag and battle slogans of the Hitler Youth.

It can be assumed that Menzel was drafted into the Volkssturm at the beginning of 1945 as a reaction to the Winter Offensive of the Red Army and died in battle. An exchange of letters shows that in 1946 Menzel's mother, for fear of an upcoming house search, consented to the burning of her son's estate, which also contained unpublished writings.

After the end of National Socialism, his writings were placed on the List of literature to be segregated in the Soviet Occupation Zone and in the German Democratic Republic.

Jan-Pieter Barbian counts Menzel to the  guard of Nazi apologists ... who expressed the political guidelines of those in power in and with their works.

Menzel was a close friend of the Siewert sisters, the painter Clara Siewert and especially the writer Elisabeth Siewert, after whose death in 1930 he wrote an obituary in the Ostdeutsche Monatshefte.

A poem by Menzel with the title "Der Kamerad" was used by Konrad Kujau as an alleged Hitler poem in the context of the Hitler diaries forged by him.

Honours 
 1938 Literaturpreis der Reichshauptstadt Berlin (3. Platz, für die Gedichte der Kameradschaft)
 1939 Ertrag der Harry-Kreismann-Stiftung
 1940 Kulturpreis der SA (für Menzels Gesamtwerk)

Writing 
 Mond und Sonne und Stern und ich. Kleine Lieder, 1926
 Im Bann. Gedichte, 1930
 Umstrittene Erde, Roman, 1930
 Franz Lüdtke, der ostdeutsche Mensch und Dichter, 1932
 Der Grenzmark-Rappe. Grenzmärkische Sagen, Erzählungen, Balladen und Gedichte, 1933
 Im Marschschritt der SA. Gedichte, 1933
 Wir sind der Sieg!, 1934
 Die große Ernte. Kantate, 1935
 Das große Gelöbnis. Eine Kantate, 1935
 In unsern Fahnen lodert Gott. Kantate, 1935
 Gedichte der Kameradschaft, 1936
 Wenn wir unter Fahnen stehen. Lieder der Bewegung, 1938
 Alles Lebendige leuchtet. Gedichte eines Jahrzehnts, 1938
 Deutschland, heiliges Deutschland! Das große Gelöbnis, 1938
 Ewig lebt die SA. Eine Feier, 1938
 Herrn Figullas Schaufenster. Heitere Geschichten, 1941
 Das Siebengestirn, Roman, 1942
 Das Friedensschiff. Satire in 3 Akten, 1943
 Anders kehren wir wieder. Gedichte, 1943
 Noch einmal Napoleon? Komödie, 1943
 Einführung in Hermann Harz, Das Erlebnis der Reichsautobahn. Ein Bildwerk, Widmung: „Dem Schöpfer der Reichsautobahnen Reichsminister Dr. Fritz Todt zum Gedächtnis." Vorwort Albert Speer. Hg. Reichsministerium Speer, Georg D. W. Callwey, o. J. (1943) München
 Der Brief. Ein Kammerspiel in 3 Akten, 1944

Literature 
 Lisa Lader, Wulf Segebrecht: Herybert Menzel. In: Der Bamberger Dichterkreis 1936–1943. Peter Lang, Frankfurt (Main) 1987 ISBN 3-8204-0104-0 S. 192–197
 Hans Sarkowicz, Alf Mentzer: Literatur in Nazi-Deutschland. Ein biografisches Lexikon., erw. Neuausgabe, Europa, Hamburg 2002, S. 309–311
 Erich Stockhorst: 5000 Köpfe. Wer war was im 3. Reich. Arndt, Kiel 2000, ISBN 3-88741-116-1 (Unveränderter Nachdruck der ersten Auflage von 1967).
 Rolf Düsterberg: Tod und Verklärung. Der NS-Propagandadichter Herybert Menzel. Internationales Archiv für Sozialgeschichte der deutschen Literatur IASL, 35 (2010), H. 2, Verlag Walter de Gruyter, Berlin 2010 ; elektronisch: 
 Rolf Düsterberg: Herybert Menzel – der Sänger der „ostmärkischen SA“. In: Derselbe (Hrsg.): Dichter für das „Dritte Reich“, Bd. 2, Aisthesis, Bielefeld 2011 ISBN 978-3-89528-855-5 S. 143–173

References

1906 births
1945 deaths
German poets
German Army personnel of World War II
Volkssturm personnel killed in acton
Sturmabteilung officers